Lüneburger Sport-Klub von 1901 e. V. was one of the oldest and most successful football clubs from the Lüneburg area until it merged with Lüneburger SV in 2008 to become Lüneburger SK Hansa.

History
The club was established on 1 April 1901 as Lüneburger Fußball-Club. Its name was changed to Lüneburger Sport-Klub in 1912. In the season 1951–52, it played in the Oberliga Nord, which was one of the leagues belonging to the highest level in West Germany at the time. In 1992–93, the club qualified for the first round of the DFB-Pokal for the first time. In 2000–01, the club played in the Regionalliga Nord. In 2005–06 the club was second in the Niedersachsen Liga Ost, and missed out on promotion to the Oberliga Nord on goal difference to VSK Osterholz-Scharmbeck. Again in 2006–07, the club was second, this time to TuS Heeslingen. In the club's final season, 2007–08, with Ralf Sievers as trainer, the qualification for the first round of the DFB-Pokal was achieved for the second time, but the new merged club took the place of Lüneburger SK in the DFB-Pokal 2008–09.

Merger
Manfred Harder, the club president and a former Bundesliga referee, merged Lüneburger SK with the football section of Lüneburger SV to form a new club called FC Hansa Lüneburg. The new club took Lüneburger SK's place in both the Oberliga Niedersachsen Ost and in the DFB-Pokal.

Notable players
 Riccardo Baich
 Marinus Bester
 Elard Ostermann
 Patrick Owomoyela
 Jens Scharping
 Sebastian Selke
 Ralf Sievers
 Jan-André Sievers
 Jörg Sievers
 Rainer Zobel
 Hans-Jürgen Ripp

Honours
The clubs honours:
 Oberliga Niedersachsen/Bremen
 Champions: 1998
 Verbandsliga Niedersachsen
 Champions: 1980

References

External links
Ultrá Gruppierung des LSK

Lüneburg
Football clubs in Germany
Defunct football clubs in Germany
Defunct football clubs in Lower Saxony
Association football clubs established in 1901
Association football clubs disestablished in 2008
1901 establishments in Germany
2008 disestablishments in Germany